Frank J. Swanson (October 19, 1865 – December 5, 1941) was an American farmer, businessman, and politician.

Born in Stockryd Jonkoping Lan, Småland, Sweden, Swanson emigrated with parents to the United States and stayed in Chicago, Illinois for nine months. Swanson and his family settled on a farm in Union County, Dakota Territory. He studied at the University of South Dakota and then helped managed his father's farm. In 1901, Swanson moved to Akron, Iowa where he was in the real estate business. Swanson was also in the banking, furniture and hardware business. He also owned a funeral home in Akron, Iowa. He was also general manager of the Farmers' Grain Company in Akron, Iowa. From 1918 to 1923, Swanson served on the Akron City Council. From 1929 to 1931, Swanson served in the Iowa House of Representatives. Swanson died in his home n Akron, Iowa of a heart ailment.

Notes

1865 births
1941 deaths
Swedish emigrants to the United States
People from Småland
Politicians from Chicago
People from Akron, Iowa
People from Union County, South Dakota
University of South Dakota alumni
Businesspeople from Iowa
Farmers from South Dakota
Iowa city council members
Republican Party members of the Iowa House of Representatives